In Greek mythology, Erigone was the daughter of Icarius of Athens.

Mythology 
Icarius was cordial towards Dionysus, who gave his shepherds wine. They became intoxicated and killed Icarius, thinking he had poisoned them. His daughter, Erigone, and her dog, Maera, found his body. Erigone hanged herself over her father's grave. Dionysus was angry and punished Athens by making all of the city's maidens commit suicide in the same way. Unfortunately, it was the instability of Dionysus who gave all the maidens alcohol as part of his cult. Erigone was placed in the stars as the constellation Virgo by Dionysus or Zeus who pitied her misfortune.

According to Ovid, Dionysus "deceived Erigone with false grapes", that is, assumed the shape of a grape cluster to approach and seduce her.

Notes

References 

 Apollodorus, The Library with an English Translation by Sir James George Frazer, F.B.A., F.R.S. in 2 Volumes, Cambridge, MA, Harvard University Press; London, William Heinemann Ltd. 1921. ISBN 0-674-99135-4. Online version at the Perseus Digital Library. Greek text available from the same website.
 Gaius Julius Hyginus, Astronomica from The Myths of Hyginus translated and edited by Mary Grant. University of Kansas Publications in Humanistic Studies. Online version at the Topos Text Project.
Gaius Julius Hyginus, Fabulae from The Myths of Hyginus translated and edited by Mary Grant. University of Kansas Publications in Humanistic Studies. Online version at the Topos Text Project.
 Publius Ovidius Naso, Metamorphoses translated by Brookes More (1859-1942). Boston, Cornhill Publishing Co. 1922. Online version at the Perseus Digital Library.
 Publius Ovidius Naso, Metamorphoses. Hugo Magnus. Gotha (Germany). Friedr. Andr. Perthes. 1892. Latin text available at the Perseus Digital Library.

Further reading
 Rosokoki, A. (1995), Die Erigone des Eratosthenes. Eine kommentierte Ausgabe der Fragmente, Heidelberg: C. Winter-Verlag

External links
 Images of Erigone in the Warburg Institute Iconographic Database

Women in Greek mythology
Attican characters in Greek mythology
Deeds of Zeus
Suicides in Greek mythology